Kyun Ma Mhar Main Ma Thar is a 1970 Burmese black-and-white drama film, directed by Thukha starring Soe Naing, Daisy Kyaw Win,  Tin Tin Nwet and Thein Maung.

Cast
Soe Naing as Saw Naing
Daisy Kyaw Win as Kyawt
Tin Tin Nwet as Myintzu Nwet
Thein Maung as U Shwe San
Jolly Swe as Jolly

Awards

References

1970 films
1970s Burmese-language films
Films shot in Myanmar
Burmese black-and-white films
1970 drama films
Burmese drama films